Melanoplus occidentalis, the flabellate grasshopper, is a species of spur-throated grasshopper in the family Acrididae. It's found in North America.

References

Melanoplinae
Articles created by Qbugbot
Insects described in 1872